The Fourth Square is a 1961 British crime film directed by Allan Davis and starring Conrad Phillips, Natasha Parry and Delphi Lawrence. Part of the long-running series of Edgar Wallace Mysteries films made at Merton Park Studios, it is loosely based on the 1929 novel Four Square Jane by Edgar Wallace.

The film's sets were designed by the art director Peter Mullins.

Cast

References

Bibliography
 Goble, Alan. The Complete Index to Literary Sources in Film. Walter de Gruyter, 1999.

External links

1961 films
British crime films
1961 crime films
Films set in England
Merton Park Studios films
Films directed by Allan Davis
Films based on British novels
Edgar Wallace Mysteries
1960s English-language films
1960s British films